Antonio Prieto (born 7 September 1973) is a former professional tennis player from Brazil.

Biography
Born in Curitiba, Prieto went to college in the United States, at Florida State University from 1994 to 1997. While studying for a business degree he played varsity tennis as the No. 1 singles player.

Prieto, who specialised in doubles, turned professional in 1997. He won an ATP Tour doubles title with countryman Gustavo Kuerten at the 2000 Chevrolet Cup, in Santiago, Chile. From the 2000 French Open to the 2001 Australian Open, Prieto appeared in the men's doubles main draw of all four Grand Slam tournaments in succession. He made the second round once, at the 2000 Wimbledon Championships with Israel's Eyal Ran.

He now runs Prieto Tennis, a tennis academy in Ecoville, Brazil.

ATP Tour career finals

Doubles: 1 (1–0)

Challenger titles

Doubles: (4)

References

External links
 
 
 

1973 births
Living people
Brazilian male tennis players
Florida State Seminoles men's tennis players
Sportspeople from Curitiba
21st-century Brazilian people
20th-century Brazilian people